Felix Creutzig (born 1979 in Hanover) is a German physicist, and professor of Sustainability Economics at Technical University of Berlin.

Education 
Creutzig studied physics and medicine at the University of Freiburg from 1999 to 2002. As student of Trinity Hall, University of Cambridge, he obtained a Master of Advanced Studies (Part III of the Mathematical Tripos) in 2003. From 2003 until 2008, Felix Creutzig followed his doctoral studies at the Humboldt University of Berlin on „Sufficient encoding of dynamical systems“ obtaining a PhD in biophysics.

Academic career 
Felix Creutzig worked as Postdoc at the Energy Resources Group at the University of California, Berkeley with Daniel Kammen and Lee Schipper. From 2009 until 2012 he was PI at the Chair of Ottmar Edenhofer at Technical University of Berlin, and visiting fellow at the Princeton Institute for International and Regional Studies collaborating with Robert H. Socolow. Since 2012, Felix Creutzig is PI at the Mercator Research Institute on Global Commons and Climate Change. In addition, he is Chair of Sustainability Economics of Human Settlements at Technical University of Berlin since 2017.

Felix Creutzig was coordinating lead author of the chapter on 'Demand, Services and Social Aspects of Mitigation' in the IPCC Sixth Assessment Report, lead author of the chapter on 'Transport' in the IPCC Fifth Assessment Report, and coordinator of the Annex on bioenergy.

He belongs to the Highly Cited Researchers 2022.

Honors and positions 
 Since 2022: Member of Expert Advisory Board Climate Change Mitigation in Mobility of the Federal Ministry of Digital and Transport
 Since 2022: Member of Climate Advisory Board Berlin
 2017: Piers Sellers Prize

References

External links
 
 

Living people
1979 births
Date of birth missing (living people)
Scientists from Hanover
German physicists
21st-century German physicists
German biophysicists
Academic staff of the Technical University of Berlin
Alumni of the University of Cambridge
Humboldt University of Berlin alumni
Studienstiftung alumni